Igor Anatolyevich Pashkevich (1 July 1971 – 26 March 2016) was a figure skating coach and competitor. He was the 1990 World Junior champion for the Soviet Union and the 1996 European silver medalist for Russia. He competed at the 1994 Lillehammer Olympics for Russia and the 1998 Nagano Olympics for Azerbaijan.

Career 
Pashkevich began skating in 1976.

For the Soviet Union and Russia 
Early in his career, Pashkevich competed for the Soviet Union and won gold at the 1990 World Junior Championships in Colorado Springs, Colorado. He represented Russia following the Soviet breakup. He placed 14th at his first senior ISU Championship, the 1993 World Championships in Prague, Czech Republic.

In February 1994, Pashkevich competed at the Winter Olympics in Lillehammer, Norway, finishing 15th. The following month, he placed 9th at the 1994 World Championships in Chiba, Japan. In 1995–96, his final season for Russia, he won gold at the 1995 Finlandia Trophy, silver at the 1995 NHK Trophy, and silver at the 1996 European Championships.

For Azerbaijan 
Pashkevich switched to Azerbaijan in the 1996–97 season. He placed seventh at the 1997 European Championships and eighth at the 1997 World Championships. The following season — his last — Pashkevich won the bronze medal at the 1997 Trophée Lalique and silver at the 1997 Nations Cup, qualifying for the Champions Series Final where he placed sixth. He withdrew from the 1998 European Championships but competed at the 1998 Winter Olympics in Nagano, Japan, and finished 16th. He was coached by Marina Kudriavtseva. He retired at the end of the season.

Post-competitive career 
After retiring from competition, Pashkevich performed in ice shows for two years. He then worked as a coach in the United States and Russia. He worked with Angela Nikodinov, Fumie Suguri, Polina Shelepen, Yulia Lipnitskaya, Evgenia Medvedeva, and Daniel Samohin. In 2016, he was a member of the coaching staff at Palm Beach Ice Works. He also worked as an ISU technical specialist.

Personal life 
Pashkevich was born on 1 July 1971 in Moscow. He held a PhD in figure skating from the Moscow State Academy of Physical Education and Sports.

He was injured in a car accident in Oregon on 12 January 2005, sustaining a concussion, a laceration on the right side of his head, a fractured bone in the back of his neck, and multiple contusions and abrasions. 

Pashkevich died on 26 March 2016 in West Palm Beach, Florida at the age of 44. He was divorced and had a daughter living in Russia.

Programs

Results 
GP: Champions Series (Grand Prix series)

References

Navigation 

1971 births
2016 deaths
Soviet male single skaters
Russian male single skaters
Azerbaijani male single skaters
Russian figure skating coaches
International Skating Union technical specialists
Olympic figure skaters of Azerbaijan
Olympic figure skaters of Russia
Figure skaters at the 1998 Winter Olympics
Figure skaters at the 1994 Winter Olympics
Figure skaters from Moscow
European Figure Skating Championships medalists
World Junior Figure Skating Championships medalists